The Korail Class 381000 trains are commuter electric multiple units in South Korea used on the Donghae Line.

Generation

1st Generation (381x01 ~ 381x10) 
 Produced by: Hyundai Rotem Changwon Plant.
 Introduction: March 3, 2016 to August 20, 2016

2nd Generation (381x11 ~ 381x17) 
 Produced by: Hyundai Rotem Changwon Plant.
 Introduction: July 27, 2018 to December 20, 2018

References 

Donghae Line
Electric multiple units of South Korea
25 kV AC multiple units
Hyundai Rotem multiple units